Lavender EP is the first EP by Swedish rapper Yung Lean, released on August 16, 2013. 

Although the EP itself was released after Lean's debut mixtape, Unknown Death 2002, all three tracks on the EP had been released on Lean's YouTube channel prior to it - the earliest and first track Lean ever uploaded was "Greygoose", on December  5, 2012.

Track listing

Reception
"Ginseng Strip 2002" and "Oreomilkshake" became popular on YouTube soon after upload, and are amongst Lean's best known songs. 

Consequence of Sound placed "Ginseng Strip 2002" at number 44 on their "Top 50 Songs of 2013".

References

External links
 Lavender EP at Discogs

2013 EPs
Alternative hip hop EPs
EPs by Swedish artists
Yung Lean albums